Claudia Gray is the pseudonym of Amy Vincent, an American writer of paranormal romance young adult fiction, best known for the Evernight series and her Star Wars novels: Lost Stars, Bloodline, Leia, Princess of Alderaan, Master and Apprentice, Into the Dark, and Star Wars: The Fallen Star.

Career
The second book in the Evernight series, Stargazer, was published in March 2009, and was ranked No. 4 in the chapter book category of The New York Times list of bestselling children's books in April 2009.

Personal life
According to her website, Gray lives in a 100-year-old coral pink-colored house in New Orleans.

Publications
 Constellation series:
Defy the Stars (2017)
Defy the Worlds (2018)
Defy the Fates (2019)
DC Comics
 House of El Book One: The Shadow Threat
Evernight series:
Evernight (2008)
Stargazer (2009)
Hourglass (2010)
Afterlife (2011)
Firebird series:
A Thousand Pieces of You
Ten Thousand Skies Above YouA Million Worlds with YouSpellcaster series:Spellcaster (2013)The First Midnight Spell (2013)Steadfast (2014)Sorceress (2015)
 Star Wars novels
 Star Wars: Lost Stars (September 2015)
 Star Wars: Bloodline (May 2016)
 Star Wars: Leia, Princess of Alderaan (September 2017)
 Star Wars: Master and Apprentice (April 2019)Star Wars: The High Republic: Into the Dark (February 2021)Star Wars: The High Republic: The Fallen Star (January 2022)
 The Murder Of Mr. Wickham (May 2022)
 The Haunted Mansion novels
 The Haunted Mansion: Storm & Shade'' (September 2023)

References

Inline citations

General references

External links

 
 "Claudia Gray", HarperCollins Publishers
 
 

American women novelists
Living people
Place of birth missing (living people)
American young adult novelists
21st-century American novelists
21st-century American women writers
Women writers of young adult literature
Writers of young adult science fiction
1970 births
Women science fiction and fantasy writers